Wayne Edwards may refer to:

Wayne Edwards (racing driver)
Wayne Edwards (baseball)
Wayne Edwards (soldier)
Edward Edwards (serial killer), middle name Wayne